The Oltrepò Pavese is an area of the Province of Pavia, in the north-west Italian region of Lombardy, which lies to the south of the river Po.

Geography

Extending over an area of c. , it is roughly triangular in shape, with a base to the north formed by the Po and a southern apex at Monte Lesima, a mountain of the Ligurian Apennines which is the highest point in the province.

To the west it is bounded by the Province of Alessandria (Piedmont) and to the east by the Province of Piacenza (Emilia-Romagna). The territory comprises a plain close to the Po, a hilly section, which rises from the Valle Staffora to the west and from the upper Val Tidone to the east, and a mountainous zone which in addition to Monte Lesima includes the peaks of Monte Chiappo (1700 m) Cima Colletta (1494 m) and Monte Penice (1460 m). The main watercourse is the Staffora; other streams include the Ardivestra, the Versa and the upper part of the Tidone, including part of the Lago di Trebecco reservoir.

The principal settlements are Voghera, Casteggio, Broni, Stradella, Santa Maria della Versa, Salice Terme and Varzi.

The region became part of Lombardy in 1859.

Tourism
Though occasionally referred to as "the Tuscany of the North of Italy", Oltrepò Pavese is relatively unknown abroad.

The area offers several attractions: rolling hills, medieval villages and castles, panoramic views, authentic Italian food and local wines. Oltrepò also happens to be the largest wine-producing area of Lombardy (and one of the largest in Italy), specializing in Pinot Nero. The landscape is scattered with vineyards that are freely accessible to hikers and mountain bikers.

Gastronomy
A well-known speciality of area are the local sparkling wines, whose various levels of carbonation are catogoized into three levels: vivace, frizzante, and spumante. Both reds and whites can be sparkling to various degrees, and can be made in either a dry or sweeter style. The most famous local wine, the Bonarda, is fruity but not sweet, in contrast to Lambrusco, a red sparkling wine which often has higher residual sugar levels. A local, more 'classical' wine is the Buttafuoco, the production of which is restricted to a small area in the North of the Oltrepò. A typical sweet red wine of the area is the Sangue di Giuda. A handful of regional spumantes—often made in the 'metodo classico' method, which originated in Champagne—have been vinted to a standard that qualifies them for DOCG categorization.

Regional dishes use the seasonal ingredients like mushrooms and truffles, the local meats of rabbit, wild boar etc. One of typical dishes is the Sunday's "pranzo" or lunch in which all of the servings of the Italian menu (antipasti, primi, secondi, contorni, dolci) pass by, sometimes even twice. The Oltrepò region is also recognized for its cured meats, such as "coppa", and even has Varzi salame, which is a protected product, much like Parmesan cheese or Prosecco.

Further reading

See also

Province of Pavia
Pavese
Lomellina

Sources

This article originated as a brief summary of its counterpart in the Italian Wikipedia.

External links
 Oltrepò Pavese official website
7 Irresistible Reasons to Come and Visit the Oltrepo Pavese
Some info on the Oltrepò Pavese
Further info on the Oltrepò Pavese
App for Smartphone with articles on the Oltrepò Pavese

Province of Pavia
Geographical, historical and cultural regions of Italy
Geography of Lombardy